Sir Geoffrey Sandford Cox  (7 April 1910 – 2 April 2008) was a New Zealand-born newspaper and television journalist. He was a former editor and chief executive of ITN and a founder of News at Ten.

Early life
Cox was born in Palmerston North, New Zealand, the son of Charles William Sandford Cox, a bank manager, and Mary Cox, daughter of Duncan MacGregor. He was educated at Southland Boys' High School, followed by the University of Otago and then a Rhodes scholarship to Oriel College, Oxford, from 1932 to 1935.

Career
His career in journalism began in 1935 when he joined the News Chronicle. He covered the Spanish Civil War from Madrid, then went to Vienna and Paris for the Daily Express in which he broke the news in 1939 that British troops had arrived in France. He then covered the Winter War from Finland. He was critical of the Soviet attack on Finland but foresaw that the Red Army would defeat the Germans.

He enlisted in the New Zealand Army, serving in Crete and North Africa as an Intelligence Officer on Freyberg's staff, then was First Secretary at the new New Zealand Embassy in Washington (when Walter Nash was Minister to the United States) before serving in Italy. In 1945, Cox was appointed a Member of the Order of the British Empire (Military Division).

In 1956 he joined ITN, the new commercial TV channel in Britain as News Editor of Independent Television News. In the 1959 New Year Honours, Cox was appointed a Commander of the Order of the British Empire, and in the 1966 New Year Honours he was knighted as a Knight Bachelor. He started News at Ten in 1967. In 1977 Cox joined Yorkshire Television (YTV) as Ward Thomas' Deputy Chairman.

In the 2000 Queen's Birthday Honours, Cox was appointed a Companion of the New Zealand Order of Merit, for services to New Zealand and New Zealand interests in the United Kingdom.

Personal life
He married Cecily Turner in 1935; they had two sons and twin daughters; his wife died in 1993.

Bibliography
Defence of Madrid (1937, Victor Gollancz, London)  (2006 Otago University Press edition) (reprinted 2006 review) 
The Red Army Moves (1941, Victor Gollancz, London) (report from Finland on the Winter War) 
The Road to Trieste (1947, Heinemann, London) 
The Race for Trieste (1977, W. Kimber, London) & (1977, Whitcoulls, Christchurch)  (revision of The Road to Trieste)
See It Happen (The Making of ITN) (1983, Bodley Head, London) 
A Tale of Two Battles (1987, W. Kimber, London)  (Greece & Crete, North Africa in World War II; Crete & Sidi Rezegh)
Countdown to War (1988, W. Kimber, London)   
Pioneering Television News: a first hand report on a revolution in journalism (c1995, John Libbey, London)   
Eyewitness: A Memoir of Europe in the 1930s (1999, University of Otago, Dunedin)  
A New Zealand Boyhood (2004, Amadines Press, Gloucestershire, England)

References
"Obituary" in Dominion Post, 10 April 2008 page B7 (from The Times & NZPA)

External links
Geoffrey Cox: Photo and article at NZ History website
 Obituary: Times
 Obituary: Telegraph
 Obituary: Guardian
 Obituary: Independent
 Obituary: ITV 
 Otago University alumni profile
 Honorary Doctorate from Otago University, 1999 
 Defence of Madrid reissued 2007, review
 Major Cox at Trieste (text)

1910 births
2008 deaths
20th-century British journalists
20th-century New Zealand journalists
20th-century English memoirists
Alumni of Oriel College, Oxford
British people of the Spanish Civil War
British television executives
British television journalists
British war correspondents
Commanders of the Order of the British Empire
Companions of the New Zealand Order of Merit
ITN
Knights Bachelor
New Zealand Army personnel
New Zealand diplomats
New Zealand emigrants to the United Kingdom
New Zealand memoirists
New Zealand male writers
New Zealand military personnel of World War II
New Zealand people of the Spanish Civil War
New Zealand Rhodes Scholars
People educated at Southland Boys' High School
People from Palmerston North
University of Otago alumni